Fritz Umgelter (18 August 1922 – 9 May 1981) was a German television director, television writer, and film director.

Umgelter worked mainly in television as both a writer and director.  He received directing credit for 68 TV films or series, and received writing credits for 22 TV films or series segments. He also directed 7 cinema films (of which he received directing credit for 6), but these were not critically acclaimed, and he remains best known for his television works.

Awards
This award is presented by the Deutsche Akademie der Darstellenden Künste and is a German analog to a BAFTA or Emmy Award.

Filmography
His film releases were:
 1958 All the Sins of the Earth
 1958  (American re-edited version 1962: The Bellboy and the Playgirls)
 1958 
 1961 Only the Wind
 1965 Tread Softly
 1967 A Handful of Heroes
 1968  (Uncredited. Director: Franz Antel)

His television work includes:
 Nicht zuhören, meine Damen! (1954) — (based on N'écoutez pas, mesdames !)
 Ein Phönix zuviel (1955) — (based on A Phoenix Too Frequent)
 Der Hund von Baskerville (1955) — (based on The Hound of the Baskervilles)
 Ein Volksfeind (1955) — (based on An Enemy of the People)
 Molière spielt in Versailles (1955) — (based on a play by  including three plays by Molière)
 Schiffchen zu 100 Francs (1956) — (based on the radio play Der Admiral by Alix du Frênes)
 Der Flüchtling (1956) — (based on a play by Fritz Hochwälder)
 Gelähmte Schwingen (1956) — (based on a play by Ludwig Thoma)
 Der Verräter (1956) — (based on the play The Traitor by Herman Wouk)
 Öl und Champagner (1956) — (based on a play by Ferenc Molnár)
 Die letzte Patrouille? (1956) — (screenplay by )
 Das Spinnennetz (1956) — (based on Spider's Web by Agatha Christie)
 Zwölftausend (1956) — (based on a play by Bruno Frank)
 Zehn Jahre und drei Tage (1956) — (based on a radio play by )
 Die Panne (1957) — (based on A Dangerous Game by Friedrich Dürrenmatt)
 Montserrat (1957) — (based on a play by Emmanuel Roblès)
 Monsignores große Stunde (1957) — (based on the play Monsignor's Hour by Emmet Lavery)
 Romeo und Julia (1957) — (based on Romeo and Juliet)
 Ganz groß in Kleinigkeiten (1957) — (based on An Eye for Detail by Berkely Mather)
 Don Carlos (1957) — (based on Don Carlos)
 Olivia (1958) — (based on Love In Idleness)
 As Far as My Feet Will Carry Me (1959, TV miniseries) — (based on the story of Cornelius Rost)
 Die Räuber (1959) — (based on The Robbers)
 Das mittlere Fenster (1959) — (based on the novel The Middle Window by Elizabeth Goudge)
 Am grünen Strand der Spree (1960, TV miniseries)
 Der Mann, der Donnerstag war (1960) — (based on The Man Who Was Thursday)
 Gericht über Las Casas (1960) — (based on the play  by Reinhold Schneider)
 Prinz Friedrich von Homburg (1961) — (based on The Prince of Homburg)
 Die Journalisten (1961) — (based on a play by Gustav Freytag)
 Und Pippa tanzt (1961) — (based on a play by Gerhart Hauptmann)
 Wer einmal aus dem Blechnapf frisst (1962, TV miniseries) — (based on a novel by Hans Fallada)
 Montserrat (1962) — (based on a play by Emmanuel Roblès)
 Der Belagerungszustand (1963) — (based on The State of Siege)
  (1963) — (based on Danton's Death)
 Die Abrechnung (1963) — (based on the play Zar Alexander by Reinhold Schneider)
 Freundschaftsspiel (1963) — (screenplay by )
 Der schlechte Soldat Smith (1963) — (based on the play The Bad Soldier Smith by William Douglas Home)
 Den Tod in der Hand (1963) — (based on the novel Échec au porteur by )
 Der Traum des Eroberers (1964) — (based on a play by Reinhold Schneider)
 König Richard III (1964) — (based on Richard III)
 Tom und seine Söhne (1964) — (based on The Country Boy)
 Bei Tag und Nacht (1964) — (based on The Dog in the Manger)
  (1964) — (based on The Physicists)
 Überstunden (1965) — (screenplay by )
 Der Sündenbock (1965) — (based on a novel by Luise Rinser)
 Nun singen sie wieder (1965) — (based on a play by Max Frisch)
 Nachtfahrt (1965) — (based on a novel by Simon Glas)
 Perlenkomödie (1966) — (based on a play by Bruno Frank)
 Münchhausen (1966) — (based on a play by Walter Hasenclever)
 Freiheit im Dezember (1966) — (screenplay by )
 Caroline (1966) — (based on a play by W. Somerset Maugham)
 Herrenhaus (1966) — (based on the play Mannerhouse by Thomas Wolfe)
 Der gute Mensch von Sezuan (1966) — (based on The Good Person of Szechwan)
 Nur einer wird leben (1966) — (based on a novel by )
 Die Affäre Eulenburg (1967) — (Docudrama about the Harden–Eulenburg affair)
 Bratkartoffeln inbegriffen (1967) — (based on Chips with Everything)
 Mr. Arcularis (1967) — (based on a story by Conrad Aiken)
 Sieben Wochen auf dem Eis (1967) — (Docudrama about the crash of the airship Italia)
 So war Herr Brummell (1967) — (film about Beau Brummell, based on a play by Ernst Penzoldt)
 Fräulein Julie (1968) — (based on Miss Julie)
 Die Freier (1969) — (based on a play by Joseph Freiherr von Eichendorff)
 Epitaph für einen König (1969) — (based on August Strindberg's play Karl XII)
  (1969, TV miniseries) — (screenplay by Wolfgang Menge, based on a novel by Henry Jaeger)
 Der Tanz des Sergeanten Musgrave (1969) — (based on Serjeant Musgrave's Dance)
  (1970, TV miniseries) — (based on Like a Tear in the Ocean by Manès Sperber)
 Sessel zwischen den Stühlen (1970) — (screenplay by Wolfgang Menge)
 Menschen (1970) — (based on Creatures That Once Were Men by Maxim Gorky)
 Merkwürdige Geschichten (1970–71, TV series, 13 episodes)
 Viel Getu' um nichts (1971) — (based on Much Ado About Nothing)
 Elsa Brändström (1971) — (Docudrama about Elsa Brändström)
 Es braust ein Ruf wie Donnerhall – Ur-Opas dufter Krieg 70/71 (co-director: Jürgen Neven-du Mont, 1971)
 Das Abenteuer eines armen Christenmenschen (1971) — (based on Story of a Humble Christian)
 Das Klavier (1972) — (based on a novel by )
 Die merkwürdige Lebensgeschichte des Friedrich Freiherrn von der Trenck (1973, TV miniseries) — (biographical film about Friedrich von der Trenck)
 Der Vorgang (1973) — (based on a novel by Ladislav Mňačko)
 Wenn alle anderen fehlen (1973) — (screenplay by )
 Der Zweck heiligt die Mittel (1973) — (based on La Fin et les Moyens by )
 Arsène Lupin (1974, TV series, 3 episodes)
  (1974) — (screenplay by )
  (1975, TV miniseries) — (biographical film about Maurice Benyovszky)
 Tatort:  (1975)
  (1975, TV miniseries) — (based on Simplicius Simplicissimus)
 Ein Badeunfall (1976) — (screenplay by )
 Tatort:  (1976)
 Die Babenberger in Österreich (1976) — (documentary about the Babenberg dynasty, starring Klaus Maria Brandauer)
  (1976, TV miniseries) — (based on a novel by Sandra Paretti)
 Tatort:  (1977)
 Tatort:  (1977)
 Vorhang auf, wir spielen Mord (1978) — (based on the novel Enter Murderers by Henry Slesar)
 Ein typischer Fall (1978) — (screenplay by )
  (1979) — (film about the Fettmilch Rising 1614)
 Dr. Knock oder Der Triumph der Medizin (1979) — (based on Knock)
 Die rote Zora und ihre Bande (1979, TV miniseries) — (based on The Outsiders of Uskoken Castle)
 Die Weber (1980) — (based on The Weavers)
 Gesucht wird ... – Drei Geschichten um nicht ganz ehrenwerte Herren (1980) — (screenplay by Herbert Reinecker)
 In Prag und anderswo (1980) — (biographical film about Jaroslav Hašek)
 Tatort:  (1981)
 Im Schlaraffenland. Ein Roman unter feinen Leuten (1981) — (based on a novel by Heinrich Mann)
 Das Traumschiff (1981–82, TV series, 6 episodes)

References

External links

1922 births
1981 deaths
Mass media people from Frankfurt
Hessischer Rundfunk people